Oussama Sahnoune (born 2 August 1992) is an Algerian swimmer who competes in the freestyle events. He competed in the men's 50 metre and men's 100 metre freestyle events at the 2016 Summer Olympics.

Olympic achievements
2016 Summer Olympics - 25th  place (50m freestyle)
2016 Summer Olympics - 31st place (100m freestyle).
2020 Summer Olympics - 37th  place (50m freestyle)
2020 Summer Olympics - 37th place (100m freestyle)

World Aquatics Championships achievements
2013 World Aquatics Championships - 20th place (50m freestyle).
2013 World Aquatics Championships - 27th place (100m freestyle).
2017 World Aquatics Championships - 20th place (50m freestyle).
2017 World Aquatics Championships - 9th place (Semi final),(100m freestyle).
2019 World Aquatics Championships - 24th place (50m freestyle).
2019 World Aquatics Championships - 23rd place (100m freestyle).
2022 World Aquatics Championships - 33rd place (50m freestyle).

Career best times

Long course (50-meter pool)

References

External links
 

1992 births
Living people
Algerian male freestyle swimmers
Olympic swimmers of Algeria
Swimmers at the 2016 Summer Olympics
Swimmers at the 2020 Summer Olympics
Swimmers at the 2010 Summer Youth Olympics
African Games silver medalists for Algeria
African Games medalists in swimming
Swimmers at the 2018 Mediterranean Games
Swimmers at the 2022 Mediterranean Games
Mediterranean Games gold medalists for Algeria
Mediterranean Games silver medalists for Algeria
Mediterranean Games bronze medalists for Algeria
Mediterranean Games medalists in swimming
Competitors at the 2011 All-Africa Games
Swimmers at the 2019 African Games
African Games gold medalists for Algeria
S.L. Benfica (swimming)
21st-century Algerian people
20th-century Algerian people